Narrows, or The Narrows, is an unincorporated community in Harney County, Oregon, United States. It was started as a community in 1889 by Lewis B. Springer and Albert Hembree. A post office was established in August 1889 and Springer, the postmaster, named it after himself. In April 1892 the name was changed to Narrows and Hembree became postmaster. The post office operated until 1936, and is now served by the New Princeton post office, zip code 97721.

Climate
According to the Köppen Climate Classification system, Narrows has a semi-arid climate, abbreviated "BSk" on climate maps.

References

Unincorporated communities in Harney County, Oregon
1889 establishments in Oregon
Populated places established in 1889
Unincorporated communities in Oregon